Cecilio is a given name. Notable people with the name include:

Cecilio Apostol (1877–1938), Filipino poet
Cecilio Báez (1862–1941), provisional President of Paraguay 1905–1906
Cecilio Perez Bordon, Paraguayan Minister of Public Works under President Fernando Lugo
Cecilio Guante (born 1960), former professional Major League Baseball player
Cecilio Lastra (born 1951), former Spanish professional boxer
Ronaldo Cecilio Leiva, Guatemalan military officer, Minister of Defence from 2006 to 2008
Cecilio Lopes (born 1979), Cape Verdean international football player
Cecilio Zubillaga Perera (1887–1948), Venezuelan journalist
Cecilio Plá (1860–1934), Spanish painter
Cecilio Putong, Filipino educator, writer, Boy Scout leader, UNESCO fellow, author, pensionado and Philippine Secretary of Education
Cecilio Romaña (1899–1997), Argentinian physician remembered for describing Romaña's sign
José Cecilio del Valle (1780–1834), first president of United Provinces of Central America
Cecilio Waterman (born 1991), Panamanian professional association football striker

See also 
Aguada Cecilio, village and municipality in Río Negro Province in Argentina
Cecilio & Kapono, pop music duo from Hawaii formed in 1973 by Henry Kapono Ka’aihue and Cecilio David Rodriguez
Doctor Cecilio Báez, town in the Caaguazú department of Paraguay
Dr. Cecilio Putong National High School, originally the Bohol National High School
Nadie oyó gritar a Cecilio Fuentes, 1965 Argentine film
Universidad José Cecilio del Valle, private higher education institution in Honduras

Spanish masculine given names